Borgone is a railway station in Borgone Susa. The station is located on the Turin-Modane railway. The train services are operated by Trenitalia.

Train services
The station is served by the following services:

Turin Metropolitan services (SFM3) Bardonecchia - Bussoleno - Turin
Turin Metropolitan services (SFM3) Susa - Bussoleno - Turin

References

 This article is based upon a translation of the Italian language version as of October 2015.

External links

Railway stations in the Metropolitan City of Turin